Božo Grkinić (November 17, 1913 – February 3, 1996) was Yugoslav water polo and basketball player and coach. 
He was a member of the Yugoslavia national water polo team and Yugoslavia national basketball team.

Water polo career 

Grkinić competed with the national water polo team at the 1948 Summer Olympics in London. He was given the honour to carry the national flag of Yugoslavia at the opening ceremony of the 1948 Summer Olympics, becoming the sixth water polo player to be a flag bearer at the opening and closing ceremonies of the Olympics.

Basketball career 

Grkinić was the first head coach of Partizan who coached them for two seasons, in 1945 and 1946 Yugoslav Basketball League.

As a player for the national basketball team Grkinić  participated in 1947 European Championship in Prague,  Czechoslovakia.

See also
 Yugoslavia men's Olympic water polo team records and statistics
 List of KK Partizan head coaches
 Nebojša Popović

References

External links
 

1913 births
1996 deaths
Yugoslav men's basketball players
Yugoslav basketball coaches
Yugoslav male water polo players
Water polo players at the 1948 Summer Olympics
Olympic water polo players of Yugoslavia
Croatian water polo coaches
People from Senj
KK Partizan coaches